Foodistan is a television cooking game show. It is produced by BIG Synergy for NDTV Good Times and Geo Entertainment. The show puts India and Pakistan's best chefs against each other in a competition. While their individual cuisines are similar, there are differences between the two cuisines. The show aired 26 episodes. The finale was between Manish Mehrotra from India and Poppy Agha from Pakistan; Manish Mehrotra walked away with the title of Foodistan.

Hosts
 Alyy Khan
 Ira Dubey

Contestants
The contestants represented both India and Pakistan and hailed from some renowned hotels groups.

India 
Madhumita Mohanta, Nimish Bhatia, Mehraj Ul Haque, Karan Suri, Rajeev Arora, Sunil Chauhan, Manish Mehrotra, Girish Krishnan monika rajput

Pakistan 
Amir Iqbal, Noor Khan, Poppy Agha, Akhtar Rehman, Muhammad Ikram, Mohammad Naeem, Mehmood Akhtar, Muhammad Saqib

Judges included the trio of Merrilees Parker from England, Sonia Jehan from Pakistan and Veer Sanghvi from India, along with some guest judges through the series.

See also
 Sur Kshetra
 MasterChef Pakistan
 MasterChef India

References

India–Pakistan relations
Indian game shows
Indian reality television series
Pakistani game shows
Pakistani reality television series